Liverpool Stadium was a boxing arena on St. Paul's Square, Bixteth Street, Liverpool, England. The UK's first purpose built boxing arena. The foundation stone was laid by the Earl of Lonsdale on 22 July 1932, and it opened to the public on 20 October 1932. The facade was finished in faience tiling with Art Deco detail, as were the lobby, corridors and public areas inside. The arena itself was wood panelled. The architect was Kenmure Kinna.

Aside from boxing, it hosted wrestling matches, pop and rock music concerts (Hawkwind's legendary live album The Space Ritual Alive in Liverpool and London used recordings from their December 1972 concert at the stadium), political hustings and trade union meetings. It closed in 1985 and was demolished in 1987.

Earlier building 
The building replaced an earlier venue of the same name, originally a Liverpool United Tramways Omnibus Company horse stables, on Pudsey Street, off London Road, on the other side of the city centre, which opened in July 1911.

Bibliography
Curley, Mallory. Beatle Pete, Time Traveller, Randy Press (2005): details how Pete Best's grandfather, Johnny Best, Sr., founded and ran Liverpool Stadium and includes an overall history of the Stadium.

References

External links
Guardian on Political Meeting
 website about the music concerts at Liverpool Stadium

History of Liverpool
Boxing venues in the United Kingdom
Sports venues demolished in 1987
Demolished sports venues in the United Kingdom